Marcus Brunson (born April 24, 1978) is a retired American sprinter who specialized in the 100 metres.

He was a two-sport NCAA athlete - football and track - and a former NCAA 60m dash record holder (6.46). He was the Pac-10 Male Track Athlete of the Year for 2001 and the 4th ranked 100m sprinter in the world in 2006.
He went to Marcos de Niza Highschool in Arizona

Brunson was inducted into the Arizona State University Hall of Fame in 2012.

Achievements

Personal bests
 60 metres – 6.46 s (indoor, 1999)
 100 metres – 9.99 s (2006)
 200 metres – 20.37 s (2001)

External links
 
 USATF profile for Marcus Brunson
 Arizona State Sun Devils bio

1978 births
Living people
American male sprinters
Track and field athletes from Phoenix, Arizona
Arizona State Sun Devils men's track and field athletes
African-American male track and field athletes
Universiade medalists in athletics (track and field)
Universiade gold medalists for the United States
Medalists at the 2001 Summer Universiade
21st-century African-American sportspeople
20th-century African-American sportspeople